Desulforhopalus is a Gram-negative, strictly anaerobic, and non-motile genus of bacteria from the family of Desulfobulbaceae.

See also 
 List of bacterial orders
 List of bacteria genera

References

Further reading 
 

Desulfobacterales
Bacteria genera